The 2022–23 Thai League 1 is the 26th season of the Thai League 1, the top Thai professional league for association football clubs, since its establishment in 1996, also known as Hilux Revo Thai League due to the sponsorship deal with Toyota Motor Thailand. A total of 16 teams will compete in the league. The season began on 12 August 2022 and is scheduled to conclude on 14 May 2023.

The 1st transfer window is from 25 May to 9 August 2022 while the 2nd transfer window is from 19 December 2022 to 17 January 2023.

Buriram United are the defending champions, while Lamphun Warriors, Sukhothai and  play-off winner Lampang have entered as the promoted teams from the 2021–22 Thai League 2.

Changes from last season

Team changes

Promoted clubs
Promoted from the 2021–22 Thai League 2
 Lamphun Warriors
 Sukhothai
 Lampang (Play-off winner 2021–22 Thai League 2)

Relegated clubs
Relegated from the 2021–22 Thai League 1
 Samut Prakan City
 Suphanburi
 Chiangmai United

Teams

There are 16 clubs in the league, with three promoted teams from Thai League 2 replacing the three teams that were relegated from the 2021-22 season.

Samut Prakan City, Suphanburi and Chiangmai United were relegated at the end of the 2021–22 season after finishing in the bottom three places of the table. Chiangmai United made their immediate return to the second-tier, while Suphanburi ended a 9-year stint in the top-flight. Samut Prakan City, on the other hand, experienced their first-ever relegation as their current incarnation, having last experienced the drop back in 2013 when they were still known as Pattaya United. The three were replaced by 2021-22 Thai League 2 champions Lamphun Warriors, who are making their maiden appearance in the top flight. They were joined by runners-up Sukhothai, who made their immediate return to the top flight and Lampang, the promotion playoff winner which was first held in 2020–21 season. Like Lamphun, Lampang are making their top-flight debut this season.

Stadium and locations

Note: Table lists in alphabetical order.

Personnel and sponsoring
Note: Flags indicate national team as has been defined under FIFA eligibility rules. Players may hold more than one non-FIFA nationality.

Managerial changes

Foreign players
The FIFA Transfer Window Period for Thailand was 25 May to 9 August 2022.

Dual citizenship/heritage players
Overseas Thai players whom have obtained a Thai passport are regarded as local players.

Notes:
  Carrying Thai heritage.
  Capped for Thailand.

League table

Positions by round

Results by match played

Results

Season statistics

Top scorers
As of 19 March 2023.

Top assists
As of 19 March 2023.

Hat-tricks

Clean sheets
As of 19 March 2023.

Awards

Monthly awards

Attendances

Overall statistical table

Attendances by home match played

Source: Thai League

See also
 2022–23 Thai League 2
 2022–23 Thai League 3
 2022–23 Thailand Amateur League
 2022–23 Thai FA Cup
 2022–23 Thai League Cup
 2022 Thailand Champions Cup

Notes

References

2022
2022–23 in Asian association football leagues
2022 in Thai football leagues